The 1979 Avon Championships of Los Angeles  was a women's tennis tournament played on indoor carpet courts at The Forum  in Los Angeles, California in the United States that was part of the 1979 Avon Championships circuit. It was the sixth edition of the tournament and was held from February 12 through February 18, 1979. Second-seeded Chris Evert won the singles title and earned $30,000 first-prize money.

Finals

Singles
 Chris Evert defeated  Martina Navratilova 6–3, 6–4
 It was Evert's 2nd singles title of the year and the 87th of her career.

Doubles
 Rosie Casals /  Chris Evert defeated  Martina Navratilova /  Anne Smith 6–4, 1–6, 6–3

Prize money

See also
 Evert–Navratilova rivalry

References

External links
 Women's Tennis Association (WTA) tournament edition details
 International Tennis Federation (ITF) tournament edition details

Avon Championships of Los Angeles
LA Women's Tennis Championships
Avon Championships of Los Angeles
Avon Championships of Los Angeles
Avon Championships of Los Angeles
Avon Championships of Los Angeles